A wash trade is a form of market manipulation in which an investor simultaneously sells and buys the same financial instruments to create misleading, artificial activity in the marketplace. First, an investor will place a sell order, then place a buy order to buy from themselves, or vice versa. This may be done for a number of reasons:

 To artificially increase trading volume, giving the impression that the instrument is more in-demand than it actually is.
 To generate commission fees to brokers in order to compensate them for something that cannot be openly paid for. This was done by some of the participants in the Libor scandal.
Some exchanges now have protections built in, sometimes mandatory for participants, such as STPF (Self-Trade Prevention Functionality) on the Intercontinental Exchange (ICE).

Wash trading has been illegal in the United States since the passage of the Commodity Exchange Act (CEA), of 1936. The practice is common in non-fungible token markets which have avoided government oversight.

See also
Bucket shop (stock market)
Round-tripping (finance)
Substance over form
Pump and dump

References

Stock market
Financial crimes